"They talk sh#t about me" is a song by M. Pokora featuring british singer Verse, from this MP3 album. It was released in june 2008 in Europe.

Track listings
CD single
 "They talk sh#t about me"
 "Forbidden drive"

Digital download
 "They talk sh#t about me"

Charts

References

2008 singles
M. Pokora songs
Songs written by M. Pokora
2008 songs
Capitol Records singles
Songs written by Natalia Keery-Fisher